The Embassy of Turkmenistan in Washington, D.C. is the diplomatic mission of Turkmenistan to the United States. It is located at 2207 Massachusetts Avenue, Northwest, Washington, D.C., in the Embassy Row neighborhood.

The Ambassador is Meret Bayramovich Orazov.

References

External links

Official website (English)
Wikimapia

Turkmenistan
Washington, D.C.
Turkmenistan–United States relations
Turkmenistan